is a privately owned airfield in the city Ryūgasaki, Ibaraki, Japan.

The airport was opened on November 11, 1969, as a private venture by Nissho Iwai. Although there are no scheduled flights, it is a base for light aircraft and pilot training. Due to its proximity to Narita International Airport, the airspace around the airport is under traffic control by Narita, and there are certain restrictions on operations. The runway is also used as a drag racing course.

The airport contains the headquarters of New Central Airservice.

References

Airports in Japan
Buildings and structures in Ibaraki Prefecture
Transport in Ibaraki Prefecture
Ryūgasaki, Ibaraki